Chuck Wagner (born June 20, 1958) is an American actor, director, musical theater historian and teacher. He has had an extensive career in theater, but is perhaps best known for co-starring in the short-lived science fiction TV series Automan (1983–84).

Notables Broadway credits include both Princes and the Wolf in Into the Woods, The Beast in Beauty and the Beast, and Javert in Les Misérables. He also played the titular role in Jekyll & Hyde on the 2nd US national tour.

Early life
Wagner was born in Nashville, Tennessee, and raised in Hartsville, Tennessee. He attended public school in Gallatin. While at Gallatin High School, he performed the leads in "My Fair Lady", "Carousel", and "Inherit the Wind". As a BFA student, he attended the University of Alabama in Tuscaloosa under Edmond Williams and the University of Southern California in Los Angeles under John Houseman. His collegiate summers were spent in Manteo, North Carolina, where he played John Borden in The Lost Colony, America's longest running outdoor drama.

Career

Television 
He is known for his role in the short-lived science fiction 1983 TV series Automan as the title character.  He also starred on the soap opera General Hospital as Randall Thompson in 1981 and 1982.

In 1981, Wagner was a contestant on the television game show Password Plus.

In 1984, he appeared on the Match Game-Hollywood Squares Hour.

In 2012, he was also a contestant on Who Wants to Be a Millionaire.

Wagner has made guest appearances on numerous TV shows, including The Dukes of Hazzard, Dynasty, and Matlock.

Musical theatre
Wagner has performed in several Broadway productions. His first role on Broadway was in The Three Musketeers in 1984 as Athos. 

Wagner went on to originate the role of Rapunzel's Prince in the original Broadway cast of Stephen Sondheim's Into the Woods (1987). The recording of that show, on which Wagner appears, won the Grammy Award for Best Musical Show Album. In 1988, he joined the cast of the first US tour of Into the Woods. playing the roles of The Wolf and Cinderella's Prince. (Roles he understudied in the original Broadway production)

Wagner has appeared on Broadway (replacement) and in the U.S. national tour (1992) of Les Misérables as Inspector Javert. In 1994, he began a four-year stint as "The Beast", in Disney's Beauty and the Beast, in both the Broadway (replacement) and Toronto productions. Wagner originated the title roles in Frank Wildhorn's Jekyll & Hyde in 1990 and Svengali in 1991 at The Alley Theatre in Houston, Texas. He reprised his dual roles in Jekyll & Hyde in the post Broadway national tour in 1999. In 2001 he toured the U.S. in Cole Porter's Kiss Me, Kate as the MacArthuresque General Harrison Howell and understudy to Rex Smith's Fred Graham. He appeared on Broadway in 2004, in Wildhorn's Dracula, The Musical, standing by for Dracula, Van Helsing and Quincey Morris.

Wagner also sang the role of Sir Percival Blakeney, aka The Scarlet Pimpernel, in the original concept recording of The Scarlet Pimpernel (1992). 

In 1997, Wagner along with the original Broadway cast of Into the Woods reunited for a tenth anniversary concert at the Broadway Theatre in New York City. Wagner reprised his roles of the Wolf and Cinderella’s Prince in the place of Robert Westenberg. (Broadway understudy Jonathan Dokuchitz played Rapunzel’s Prince in Wagner’s place.)

In 1999, he released a self-titled solo CD, on which he sang songs from the various musicals in which he has appeared. He also recorded demo songs for a cancelled Star Wars musical, in which he played Han Solo.

He played The Captain of the S.S. American in Kathleen Marshall's production of the Cole Porter musical Anything Goes in a year long tour that began in October 2012. In November 2013 he starred as Jean Valjean in Les Misérables as Equity Guest Artist at Lipscomb University in Nashville, Tennessee.

In February 2014, he reprised his role as Javert in Les Misérables for the North Carolina Theatre in Raleigh. He was accompanied by his former broadway co-star, Craig Schulman, who reprised his role as Valjean. The show was directed by Dave Clemmons, who played Valjean opposite Wagner during the U.S. National Tour. In May 2014 he played Javert in Les Misérables for Studio Tenn with the Nashville Symphony at the Schermerhorn Symphony Center. In June 2014 he appeared as Jean Valjean in Les Misérables at the Lyric Theatre in Oklahoma City in a production featuring a 100 voice chorus.

Other work

He has appeared in commercials for Zyban, and toured as the Ringmaster in both the 136th edition of the Ringling Brothers and Barnum & Bailey Circus, Circus of Dreams (2006 through 2007), and the 138th edition Over The Top (2008 to 2009).

In 2010, while at home in Pensacola Beach, Florida, he joined the response to the BP oil spill helping to coordinate a large scale mechanical beach operation while safeguarding the local sea turtles.

An avid musical theatre historian, Wagner served as Visiting Artist in Residence at the University of West Florida in Pensacola. He performs concerts and teaches in high schools and colleges. Between theatrical jobs he is a member of the touring concert series, Neil Berg's 100 Years of Broadway.

Notable theatre roles

Discography

Filmography

References

External links
 Chuck Wagner website
 
 
 

Living people
American male film actors
American male singers
Ringmasters
American male musical theatre actors
American male television actors
American male soap opera actors
People from Nashville, Tennessee
People from Hartsville, Tennessee
Year of birth missing (living people)